Azamulin is a pleuromutilin antibiotic. , it is not marketed in the US or Europe.

In pharmacological studies, the substance is used as an inhibitor of the liver enzymes CYP3A4 and CYP3A5.

References 

CYP3A4 inhibitors
Pleuromutilin antibiotics
Experimental drugs